IL2CPU (IL To CPU) is an ahead-of-time (AOT) compiler for .NET that is written using one of its Common Intermediate Language compliant languages (C#). It translates Common Intermediate Language to bare metal machine code. IL2CPU is the primary compilation component of the Cosmos Project, and is developed by the same team.

History
IL2CPU was created in 2005 by the Cosmos team. It was originally designed for the .NET Framework, but has since been upgraded to .NET Core, which is now known as just .NET.

, it is planned to be superseded by .NET's native ahead-of-time (AOT) compiler, NativeAOT, however it is still in active development.

Technical details
IL2CPU is a console program invoked by the Cosmos build process. It takes in a dynamic link library (DLL) file, systematically scans its opcodes and outputs x86 instructions to be consumed by one of Cosmos's output methods, e.g. to create an ISO disk image file or to be booted over the network via PXE.

See also 

 Cosmos
 .NET
 Mono
 Bartok
 Open CIL JIT

External links 
 

Free software programmed in C Sharp
Free compilers and interpreters
Beta software